Theophilus Verbeeck (17 July 1889, in Berchem – 2 August 1951, in Antwerp) was a former football player and chairman, best known as chairman of Belgian club R.S.C. Anderlecht (1911–1951).

Théo Verbeeck first played for Daring Club de Bruxelles since there was no club in Anderlecht at the time, and then moved to SC Anderlechtois in 1908, when the club was founded. In 1911, he became also the chairman of the club at 23 years. Six years later Théo Verbeeck decided that his club would move to Astrid Park in Anderlecht where they still play now. In 1922 the club first reached the top level of Belgian football.

In 1942, Théo Verbeeck signed Jef Mermans, a striker with whom SC Anderlechtois would win their first Belgian title, in 1951. Days after the first title of his club, Théo Verbeeck died. He was replaced by Albert Roosens at the head of the club. The street where the Constant Vanden Stock Stadium is located was renamed after Théo Verbeeck on 2 August 1951.

References
Anderlecht-online

R.S.C. Anderlecht players
Belgian footballers
1951 deaths
People from Berchem
1889 births
Footballers from Antwerp
Association footballers not categorized by position